Reginald Thomas Brown (July 4, 1911 – May 13, 1981) was an American film editor and television director. He directed the western television series 26 Men, which starred Tris Coffin and Kelo Henderson.

Selected filmography 
 Appointment in Berlin (1943)
 Cry of the Werewolf (1944)
 The Mark of the Whistler (1944)
 Sergeant Mike (1944)
 The Power of the Whistler (1945)
 Adventures of Rusty (1945)
 Forbidden Jungle (1950)
 The Fighting Stallion (1950)
 Federal Man (1950)
 The Marshal's Daughter (1953)
 Son of the Renegade (1953) - only directing film credit
 Four Fast Guns (1960)
 Tarzan and the Jungle Boy (1968)
 The Gay Deceivers (1969)
 The Curious Female (1970)

References

Bibliography

External links 

1911 births
1981 deaths
People from Solano County, California
American film editors
American television editors
American television directors